This is a list of yearly Nebraska College Conference football standings.

Nebraska College Conference football standings

Pre-NAIA (1919–1955)

NAIA (1956–1969)

NAIA Division I (1970–1976)

References

Nebraska College Conference
Nebraska College Conference
Standings
Nebraska College Conference football standings